The 2019 Sacramento State Hornets football team represented California State University, Sacramento as a member of the Big Sky Conference during the 2019 NCAA Division I FCS football season. Led by first-year head coach Troy Taylor, the Hornets compiled an overall record of 9–4 with a mark of 7–1 in conference play, sharing the Big Sky title with Weber State. Sacramento State received an at-large bid to the NCAA Division I Football Championship playoffs where, after a first-round bye, they lost to Austin Peay in the second round. The Hornets played home games at Hornet Stadium in Sacramento, California.

Previous season
The Hornets finished the 2018 season 2–8, 0–7 in Big Sky play to finish in last place.

On November 26, head coach Jody Sears was fired. He finished at Sacramento State with a five-year record of 20–35.

Preseason

Big Sky preseason poll
The Big Sky released their preseason media and coaches' polls on July 15, 2019. The Hornets were picked to finish in twelfth place by the media and in eleventh by the coaches.

Preseason All–Big Sky team
The Hornets had one player selected to the preseason all-Big Sky team.

Offense

Elijah Dotson – RB

Schedule

Despite Northern Colorado also being a member of the Big Sky Conference, the September 14 game against Sacramento State was considered a non-conference game.

Game summaries

Southern Oregon

at Arizona State

Northern Colorado

at Fresno State

Eastern Washington

at Montana State

Montana

at Cal Poly

Weber State

at Northern Arizona

at Idaho

UC Davis

FCS Playoffs
The Hornets entered the postseason tournament as the number four seed, with a first-round bye.

Austin Peay–Second Round

Ranking movements

References

Sacramento State
Sacramento State Hornets football seasons
Big Sky Conference football champion seasons
Sacramento State
Sacramento State Hornets football